Neurobathra bohartiella is a moth of the family Gracillariidae. It is known from California, United States.

The larvae feed on Quercus agrifolia. They mine the leaves of their host plant. It is thought that late-season generations are dependent on early-season defoliations by a dioptid moth that result in secondary flushing of new leaves.

References

External links
mothphotographersgroup

Gracillariinae
Moths described in 1971